These are the official results of the Men's Hammer Throw event at the 1995 World Championships in Gothenburg, Sweden. There were a total number of 44 participating athletes, with the final held on Sunday August 6, 1995. The qualification mark was set at 76.50 metres.

Medalists

Schedule
All times are Central European Time (UTC+1)

Abbreviations
All results shown are in metres

Records

Qualification

Group A

Group B

Final

See also
 1992 Men's Olympic Hammer Throw (Barcelona)
 1994 Men's European Championships Hammer Throw (Helsinki)
 1995 Hammer Throw Year Ranking
 1996 Men's Olympic Hammer Throw (Atlanta)
 1998 Men's European Championships Hammer Throw (Budapest)

References
 Results
 IAAF
 hammerthrow.wz
 Die Leichtathletik-Statistik-Seite

Hammer
Hammer throw at the World Athletics Championships